Ding Lei (born 1 October 1971), also known as William Ding, is a Chinese billionaire businessman, and the founder and CEO of NetEase (163.com).

Ding made significant contributions to the development of computer networks in mainland China. In late 2016, Ding was looking into investing in the property sector, and travelled to Zimbabwe in December, and to the United Kingdom. As of April 2021, Bloomberg Billionaires Index estimated Ding's fortune to be $35.8 billion.

Early life
Ding Lei was born in Fenghua, Ningbo, Zhejiang Province, China. He graduated from Chengdu Institute of Radio Engineering (now University of Electronic Science and Technology of China) and obtained a bachelor's degree.

Career
After graduation he first worked in a local state department in Ningbo as an engineer, and then he went to Guangzhou and worked for Sybase there. He founded NetEase and became the richest individual in Chinese mainland in the year of 2003 (7.6 billion yuan), becoming the country's first internet and first gaming billionaire. According to the Hurun Report 2013, his net worth is estimated to be $5.2 billion.

In 2012, it was confirmed that Ding branched NetEase's activities out into pork production. The pig farm is centered around technology and environmental sustainability, and is not meant to become a major arm of the company.

In May 2017, venture capital firm Sinovation Ventures, US-based Meituan-Dianping, and Alibaba competitor JD invested a total of US$23 million into the farm.

In June 2020, Ding purchased a 16,000-square-foot Bel Air, Los Angeles, mansion for US$29 million from the Tesla and SpaceX founder Elon Musk.

References

External links
Article on Ding Lei, China Today (2004)

1971 births
Living people
Chinese technology company founders
Billionaires from Zhejiang
Businesspeople from Ningbo
University of Electronic Science and Technology of China alumni
NetEase people
21st-century Chinese businesspeople
Members of the 13th Chinese People's Political Consultative Conference